Professor Zulekha Haque (née Habibullah, died 8 December 2014) was a prolific Bangladeshi researcher of ancient and medieval art of Bengal. She served as the chairperson of the department of history of Eden Mohila College. She was awarded Ekushey Padak in 2018 by the Government of Bangladesh.

References

2014 deaths
Bangladeshi women scholars
Bangladeshi women academics
Recipients of the Ekushey Padak
Academic staff of Eden Mohila College
Year of birth missing
Place of birth missing
Place of death missing